The Papakura Local Board is one of the 21 local boards of the Auckland Council. It is overseen by the Manurewa-Papakura ward councillor.

The local board area extends between Alfriston and Drury, and includes Takanini, Hingaia, Red Hill, Pahurehure and the Papakura town centre.

Demographics

Papakura Local Board Area had a population of 57,636 at the 2018 New Zealand census, an increase of 12,000 people (26.3%) since the 2013 census, and an increase of 16,077 people (38.7%) since the 2006 census. There were 17,049 households, comprising 28,599 males and 29,037 females, giving a sex ratio of 0.98 males per female. The median age was 32.0 years (compared with 37.4 years nationally), with 13,632 people (23.7%) aged under 15 years, 13,155 (22.8%) aged 15 to 29, 24,786 (43.0%) aged 30 to 64, and 6,063 (10.5%) aged 65 or older.

Ethnicities were 49.1% European/Pākehā, 26.8% Māori, 16.9% Pacific peoples, 23.4% Asian, and 2.6% other ethnicities. People may identify with more than one ethnicity.

The percentage of people born overseas was 30.2, compared with 27.1% nationally.

Although some people chose not to answer the census's question about religious affiliation, 40.0% had no religion, 36.4% were Christian, 2.4% had Māori religious beliefs, 5.7% were Hindu, 1.5% were Muslim, 1.3% were Buddhist and 6.7% had other religions.

Of those at least 15 years old, 8,019 (18.2%) people had a bachelor's or higher degree, and 8,688 (19.7%) people had no formal qualifications. The median income was $32,800, compared with $31,800 nationally. 6,738 people (15.3%) earned over $70,000 compared to 17.2% nationally. The employment status of those at least 15 was that 23,541 (53.5%) people were employed full-time, 4,956 (11.3%) were part-time, and 2,313 (5.3%) were unemployed.

2019–2022 term
The current members of the board, elected at the 2019 local body elections, are:
Keven Mealamu, Papakura First – (6079 votes)
Brent Catchpole, Papakura Action Team – (5247 votes)
George Hawkins, Papakura Action Team – (4549 votes)
Jan Robinson, Papakura Action Team – (4030 votes)
Felicity Auva'a, Papakura First – (3699 votes)
Sue Smurthwaite, Papakura Action Team – (3666 votes)

2016–2019 term
The board members who served from the 2016 local body elections to the 2019 elections were:
 Brent Catchpole (Chair)
 Felicity Auva'a (Deputy chair)
 George Hawkins
 Bill McEntee
 Michael Turner
 Katrina Winn

References

Local boards of the Auckland Region